Schleswig Air Base is an airbase of the German Air Force, home to Taktisches Luftwaffengeschwader 51 (Tactical Air Force Wing 51) "Immelmann" (AKG 51) flying reconnaissance variants of the Panavia Tornado. It was formerly known from c.1945-1958 as RAF Schleswigland in Royal Air Force (RAF) use.

History 

The airfield in Schleswig/Jagel was founded in 1916 and has been in military use since. During the Second World War, night fighters were based here, including the Messerschmitt Me 262.

After the end of World War II British Air Force of Occupation took control of the field on 6 May 1945, which they called Airfield B.164. In the Summer of 1945 Hawker Typhoon Ibs of No. 121 Wing RAF were based there. In February 1948 RAF Schleswigland became active again as a training field for transport- and glider-aircraft from other stations. RAF Schleswigland was chosen as an operating base for the Berlin Airlift (RAF Codename Operation Plainfare) in the fall of 1948. On 11 November 1948 the first transport aircraft, Handley Page Hastings C.1s of No. 47 Squadron RAF arrived. No. 297 Squadron followed later during the airlift. Civilian companies started using RAF Schleswigland to airlift fuel to Berlin, since Schleswigland was well equipped which underground fuel lines dating from German use during the war. Lancashire Aircraft Corp. started flight on 24 November 1948 which specially converted Handley Page Halifax/Haltons, British American Air Services with Handley Page Halton starting 25 January 1949, Westminster Airways with Handley Page Halton starting 29 January 1949 and Scottish Airlines effective 19 February 1949 with Consolidated Liberator. 
On 6 October 1949 the last airlift flight operated out of RAF Schleswigland, marking the end of Operation Plainfare.

During the 1950s the 2.TTF was based at RAF Schleswigland with De Havilland Mosquito TT.35 used for target towing. 
In 1955 King Olav V of Norway visited RAF Schleswigland, since the Royal Norwegian Air Force was using the airfield for training from time to time since the end of the Second World War. 

Other units:
 No. 26 Squadron RAF with the Spitfire XIV & XI during 1945
 No. 56 Squadron RAF with the Typhoon IB during 1945
 No. 175 Squadron RAF with the Typhoon IB during 1945
 No. 181 Squadron RAF with the Typhoon IB during September 1945
 No. 182 Squadron RAF with the Typhoon IB during September 1945
 No. 184 Squadron RAF with the Typhoon IB during 1945
 No. 245 Squadron RAF with the Typhoon IB during 1945

The Royal Air Force closed RAF Schleswigland in April 1958 and turned the southern part of the field over to German control. In June 1958 the newly formed German Navy based the Marinefliegergeschwader 1, established on 12 March 1957 as Marinefliegergruppe 1 in Kiel, in what was now known as Schleswig-Jagel.

In October 1959, the northern part of the airfield was handed over from the Royal Air Force to the German Navy. But it wasn't until November 1961 when the British left the last building at Schleswigland. (German text only)

Accidents and incidents
10 March 1949, Avro Lancaster B.1(FE) PA380 of the Central Signals Establishment from RAF Watton required service by a Mobile Repair & Salvage Unit (MRSU) at RAF Schleswigand after unknown accident.
On 21 March 1949, Handley Page Halton, G-AJZZ, of Lancashire Aircraft Corporation crashed  miles from RAF Schleswigland. 3 crew members were killed in the crash. The radio operator was the only survivor.
On 5 April 1949, Handley Page Hastings C.1, TG534, of No. 297 Squadron caught fire during engine start-up, broke in half and was destroyed.
On 19 May 1949, Handley Page Hastings C.1, TG510, of No. 47 Squadron crash landed after undercarriage trouble during take-off. The aircraft was repaired by a Mobile Repair & Salvage Unit (MRSU).
Unknown date, Handley Page Hastings C.1, TG573, required service by a Mobile Repair & Salvage Unit (MRSU) at RAF Schleswigand after unknown accident.
On 31 October 1953, de Havilland Mosquito T.3, VP351, port undercarriage hit a snow bank.
On 24 February 1956, de Havilland Mosquito TT.35, RS717, hit an obstruction in poor visibility.
On 20 Novembre 1956, de Havilland Mosquito TT.35, TA669, crashed during landing.
On 17 Octobre 1957, de Havilland Mosquito TT.35, TA686, crashed during takeoff.

Berlin Airlift casualties at RAF Schleswigland 
15 January 1949, Gd. Eng. Teodor Supernat. Lancashire Aircraft Corporation. Ground accident with an RAF Hastings.
15 January 1949, Gd. Eng. Patrick Jmes Griffin. Lancashire Aircraft Corporation. Ground accident with an RAF Hastings.
15 January 1949, Gd. Eng. Edward O´Nil. Lancashire Aircraft Corporation. Ground accident with an RAF Hastings.
15 January 1949, unknown German lorry driver.  Ground accident with an RAF Hastings.
21 March 1949, Capt. Robert John Freight. Lancashire Aircraft Corporation. Crash of Handley Page Halton G-AJZZ
21 March 1949, Nav Off James Patrick Lewin Sharp. Lancashire Aircraft Corporation. Crash of Handley Page Halton G-AJZZ
21 March 1949, Eng Off Henry Patterson. Lancashire Aircraft Corporation. Crash of Handley Page Halton G-AJZZ

References

Bibliography

 Provan, Davies,Machat, Berlin Airlift-The effort and the aircraft- (Paladwr Press, VA USA, 1998) 
 Pearcy,  Berlin Airlift (Airlife, Shrewsbury* Pearcy, Berlin Airlury, 1997) 
 Rodrigo, Berlin Airlift (Cassell, London, 1960)
 Lancashire Aircraft Corporation, Berlin Airlift'' (Walthamstow Press, Walthamstow, 1949)
Allied Museum Berlin, "A Museum Landing" The Biography of the Hastings TG503 ( Allied Museum, Berlin, 2003)
Hall, Handley Page Hastings -Warpaint Series No.62 (Warpaint Books, Bletchley)
Bingham, Handley Page Hastings & Hermes (GMS Enterprises, Peterborough, 1998) 
Senior, Handley Page Hastings (Verdun Publishing, Stamford, 2008)

External links
 British Berlin Airlift Association
 Alliierten Museum (The Allied Museum) - museum of the history of western forces in Berlin and Germany from 1945 to 1994 (in German, English and French)
 RAF Schleswigland and RAF Gatow during the Berlin Airlift

Bases of the German Air Force
Airports in Schleswig-Holstein